Anthony Cary, 5th Viscount Falkland PC (16 February 1656 – 24 May 1694; the surname is spelt Carey in some sources) was an English born, Scottish nobleman and English politician.

He was born at Farley Castle, Somerset, the son of Henry Cary, 4th Viscount Falkland, to whose peerage he succeeded as a child in 1663.

He married Rebecca Lytton and had one daughter:
 Harriott Cary (d. 21 October 1683)

As a Scottish peer he was entitled to be a Member of the Parliament of England.  He thus served as Tory MP for Oxfordshire for 1685–1689, Great Marlow from 1689 to 1690, and Great Bedwyn from 1690 until his death.

He was sworn of the Privy Council of England in 1692 and served as First Lord of the Admiralty from 1693 to 1694.  He had previously held office with the latter department as Treasurer of the Navy from 1681 to 1689, under Charles II and James II, and as Commissioner of the Admiralty from 1690 to 1693. Samuel Pepys had a rather low opinion of his abilities, while admitting that he suffered from chronic ill-health.

In March 1694 he was committed to the Tower of London on charges of peculation and died of smallpox in May, aged 38, without male issue. He was buried in Westminster Abbey.

The Falkland Islands are named in his honour. The Viscounts Falkland in turn take their title from the Scottish monarchs' residence Falkland Palace, in Falkland, Fife, Scotland.

References

thePeerage.com

1656 births
1694 deaths
17th-century Royal Navy personnel
Falkland Islands culture
Lords of the Admiralty
Members of the Privy Council of England
17th-century Scottish peers
English MPs 1685–1687
English MPs 1689–1690
English MPs 1690–1695
Deaths from smallpox
Viscounts Falkland